The 2012 NWT/Yukon Scotties Tournament of Hearts, the women's provincial curling championship for the Yukon and Northwest Territories, were originally scheduled for January 26 to 29 at the Yellowknife Curling Club in Yellowknife, Northwest Territories. However, due to no entries into the Yukon Ladies Championship, the Northwest Territories Ladies Championship, held January 13–15, at the Inuvik Curling Club, in Inuvik, was used to determine a representative for the Yukon/Northwest Territories. Kerry Galusha and her team from Yellowknife won the tiebreaker final, and the right to represent Yukon/Northwest Territories, at the 2012 Scotties Tournament of Hearts in Red Deer, Alberta, where Galusha would finish round robin with a 4-7 record.

Teams
 Kerry Galusha (Yellowknife)
 Bridget Larocque (Inuvik)
 Maureen Miller (Yellowknife) 
 Melba Mitchell  (Inuvik)

Standings

Results

Draw 1

Draw 2

Draw 3

Draw 4

Draw 5

Draw 6

Final

References

Yukon NWT
NWT/Yukon Scotties Tournament of Hearts
Curling in the Northwest Territories
Sport in Yellowknife
Scotties Tournament of Hearts